Wheelchair basketball was contested at the 2011 Parapan American Games from November 13 to 19 at the CODE Dome in Guadalajara, Mexico.

Medal summary

Medal table

Medal events

Men

Preliminary round

Group A

Group B

Elimination round

Quarterfinals

5th–8th Classification

Semifinals

Seventh-place match

Fifth-place match

Bronze-medal match

Gold-medal match

Women

Preliminary round

Group A

Group B

Elimination round

Semifinals

Seventh-place match

Fifth-place match

Bronze-medal match

Gold-medal match

External links
2011 Parapan American Games – Wheelchair basketball

Events at the 2011 Parapan American Games
Para
Wheelchair basketball at the Parapan American Games